Marina Zhirova (born 6 June 1963 Yegoryevsk)  is a Soviet athlete who competed mainly in the 100 metres, training at Trudovye Rezervy in Moscow Oblast.

She competed for the USSR in the 1988 Summer Olympics held in Seoul, South Korea in the 4 x 100 metres where she won the bronze medal with her team mates Lyudmila Kondratyeva, Galina Malchugina and Natalya Pomoshchnikova.

References

Sports Reference

1963 births
Russian female sprinters
Soviet female sprinters
Olympic bronze medalists for the Soviet Union
Athletes (track and field) at the 1988 Summer Olympics
Olympic athletes of the Soviet Union
Living people
People from Yegoryevsk
Medalists at the 1988 Summer Olympics
Olympic bronze medalists in athletics (track and field)
Olympic female sprinters
Sportspeople from Moscow Oblast